Growth arrest and DNA-damage-inducible, beta, also known as GADD45B, is a protein which in humans is encoded by the GADD45B gene.

Function 

This gene is a member of a group of genes whose transcript levels are increased following stressful growth arrest conditions and treatment with DNA-damaging agents. The genes in this group respond to environmental stresses by mediating activation of the p38/JNK pathway.  This activation is mediated via their proteins binding and activating MTK1/MEKK4 kinase, which is an upstream activator of both p38 and JNK MAPKs. The function of these genes or their protein products is involved in the regulation of growth and apoptosis. These genes are regulated by different mechanisms, but they are often coordinately expressed and can function cooperatively in inhibiting cell growth.

Gadd45b is required for activity-induced DNA demethylation of specific promoters and expression of corresponding genes necessary for adult neurogenesis, including brain-derived neurotrophic factor and fibroblast growth factor. Hence GADD45B is implicated in affecting synaptic plasticity.

Interactions 

GADD45B has been shown to interact with:
 ASK1, 
 GADD45GIP1,
 MAP2K7 and
 MAP3K4.

See also 
Gadd45

References

Further reading